Vadász is a Hungarian surname meaning "hunter". Notable people with the surname include:

Leslie L. Vadász (born 1936), Hungarian-American engineer and manager
László Vadász (1948–2005), Hungarian chess grandmaster
Mária Vadász (1950–2009), Hungarian handball player
Viktor Vadász (born 1986), Hungarian football player

See also
Vânători (disambiguation)

Hungarian-language surnames
Occupational surnames